is a Japanese special effects director and actor.

Biography
Suzuki had a rather short career at Toho as a special effects director of theatrical films, which only spanned across one Mothra movie and two Godzilla films. It appears that Suzuki might have taken the blunt of the blame for Godzilla vs. Megaguirus (2000) box office failure, which is why his career might have ended so abruptly. Before Suzuki became a director of special effects, he was the assistant special effects director for The Imperial Navy (1981) as his first production. He dabbled in assisting outside of special effects, before teaming with Koichi Kawakita for Sayonara Jupiter (1984). Seven years later, Suzuki became Kawakita's go-to assistant from Godzilla vs. King Ghidorah (1991) until Kawakita's retirement from theatrical work.

In 2003, Suzuki was back at Toho, however, this time in the director's chair as he helped helm Toho's successful The Gransazers TV show. He continued this trend with the follow-up series in the Star God franchise: The Justirisers (2004).

Filmography

Special Effects Director
 Rebirth of Mothra III (1998)
 Godzilla 2000: Millennium (1999)
 Godzilla vs. Megaguirus (2000)

Special Effects Assistant Director
 The Imperial Navy (1981)
 Sayonara Jupiter (1984)
 Godzilla vs. King Ghidorah (1991)
 Godzilla vs. Mothra (1992)
 Godzilla vs. Mechagodzilla II (1993)
 Godzilla vs. SpaceGodzilla (1994)
 Yamato Takeru (1994)
 Godzilla vs. Destoroyah (1995)
 Rebirth of Mothra (1996)
 Rebirth of Mothra II (1997)

Director
 ChouSeiShin GranSazer (2003)
 Genseishin Justiriser (2004)

Assistant Director
 Daijobu, My Friend (1983)
 Tampopo (1985)

Acting
 Godzilla Against Mechagodzilla (2002)

References

External links

https://www.tohokingdom.com/people/kenji_suzuki.htm

1957 births
People from Ibaraki Prefecture
Living people
Special effects people